Christianity is the predominant religion in Tuvalu, with Calvinism being the single largest denomination. The Church of Tuvalu (Tuvaluan: Te Ekalesia Kelisiano Tuvalu, EKT) accounts for around 97% of the total population and is the state church of Tuvalu, although in practice this merely entitles it to "the privilege of performing special services on major national events". It is Calvinist in orientation and has a Congregationalist polity.

Church of Tuvalu 
Adherents of the Church of Tuvalu comprise about 97% of the 11,000 (2017 estimate) inhabitants of Tuvalu. 

The most prominent building on Funafuti is the Fētu'ao Lima (Morning Star Church) of the Church of Tuvalu.

Other religions/denominations 
Most followers of other religions or denominations, making up small populations of members of the Seventh-day Adventist Church, the Tuvalu Brethren Church (a charismatic Protestant denomination), the Jehovah's Witnesses and Catholics, are found in the capital city, Funafuti. The small following of the Baháʼí Faith are found on Nanumea Island.

The Catholic community is served by the Mission Sui Iuris of Funafuti. The sole Catholic church in the country is Teone Church in Vaiaku.

There are also smaller numbers of Muslims, Baptists, members of the Church of Jesus Christ of Latter-day Saints and atheists. As of 2010, the Ahmadiyya Muslim Community had approximately 50 members in the country, representing 0.5% of the population.

Religious demographics 
The population of Tuvalu was 11,000 as of 2017 estimates, up from 10,837 in the 2012 census.

, the various denominations following Christianity make up roughly (rounding errors with small overall population) 99% of the population. Overall, the largest faith groups are:
 Church of Tuvalu 97%
 Seventh-day Adventist Church 1.4%
 Baháʼí 1%
 all other faiths or denominations

Religious freedom
The constitution of Tuvalu establishes Tuvalu as an "independent state based on Christian principles, the Rule of Law, and Tuvaluan custom and tradition". The constitution specifically establishes the freedom of religion, although it allows this freedom to be limited by laws written under the Religious Organizations Restriction Act (RORA). Several observers have noted that the RORA appears incompatible with the constitution, though there has not yet been a legal challenge to the act.

In 2017, with the aim of helping enhance Tuvalu's development, the government announced the establishment of a national action plan on human rights, including affirmation of the freedom of religion, aimed at "systematically addressing the needs of marginalized populations" in the country. The remainder of this section has not (yet) been updated with any possible changes to the RORA that may result from this action plan on human rights.

Under the RORA, religious organizations whose adult membership comprises at least 2% of the population of Tuvalu are required to register with the government or face prosecution. Additionally, all religious groups, regardless of size, must register with and gain approval from the traditional elder councils (falekaupule) of any island on which they wish to practice their religion in public if it "directly threaten the values and culture of the island community"; note that the RORA guarantees an individual's right to worship freely within one's residence, should their larger community be restricted from public worship.

Representatives of religious minorities on the main island of Funafuti report that they are able to practice their faiths freely. Reports from 2014 relayed that the situation was more restrictive on other islands, where the falekaupule had used their authority, under the RORA, to issue proselytization bans. That same year, Jehovah's Witnesses on Nanumanga stated that they had experienced threats of violence, though government officials denied threats of violence had been made.

Court protection 
In 2003, some members of the Tuvalu Brethren Church on Nanumanga reported that discrimination, including acts and threats of violence, hindered their religious freedom on that island, which prompted them to commence proceedings in the High Court of Tuvalu in 2004. The case moved through the courts, and in 2009 the Court of Appeal of Tuvalu determined that the constitutional rights of these members had been breached.

In 2008, four members of the Tuvalu Brethren Church on Nanumaga sued in the High Court claiming unlawful dismissal from their employment on grounds that included unlawful discrimination on the basis of religion and that their constitutional right to freedom of belief, expression and association had been denied. Three of the claims were dismissed, with a fourth plaintiff being awarded general damages and aggravated damages.

References